The Independent Spirit Award for Best Breakthrough Performance is an award presented annually at the Independent Spirit Awards to honor outstanding performances given by a new talent in an independent film. It was first presented in 1995 at the 10th Independent Spirit Awards as Best Debut Performance, which was won by Sean Nelson for his performance in the film Fresh. 

The category was then discontinued in 2005, but it was later re-introduced as Best Breakthrough Performance at the 2023 ceremony.

Winners and nominees

1990s

2000s

2020s

References

Breakthrough
Awards for young actors
Film awards for debut actress
Film awards for male debut actors